

The Altinger Lenticular is an Argentine single-seat FAI Standard Class glider designed and built by Theo Altinger.

Design and development
The Lenticular 15S was built with financial assistance from the Argentine Soaring Association for use by flying clubs in Argentina. The glider was built in time to enter the gliding national championship in 1972.

The Lenticular 15S is a cantilever mid-wing monoplane with a glass-fibre semi-monocoque structure and a cantilever T-tail. The pilot has a fully enclosed cockpit with a transparent canopy. The Lanticular 15S has a retractable monowheel landing gear with a semi-recessed tailwheel.

Specifications

See also
 I.Ae. 34 Clen Antú
 I.Ae. 41 Urubú

References

Notes

Bibliography

1970s Argentine sailplanes
Glider aircraft
T-tail aircraft
Aircraft first flown in 1972
Mid-wing aircraft